Trentino-Alto Adige/Südtirol is an autonomous region of Italy, located in the northern part of the country. The region has a population of 1.1 million, of whom 62% speak Italian as their mother tongue, 30% speak South Tyrolean German and several foreign languages are spoken by immigrant communities. Since the 1970s, most legislative and administrative powers have been transferred to the two self-governing provinces that make up the region: the Province of Trento, commonly known as Trentino, and the Province of Bolzano, commonly known as South Tyrol (Alto Adige in Italian). In South Tyrol, German remains the sizeable majority language.

From the 9th century until 1801, the region was part of the Holy Roman Empire. After being part of the short-lived Napoleonic Republic of Italy and Napoleonic Kingdom of Italy, the region was part of the Austrian Empire and its successor Austria-Hungary from 1815 until its 1919 transfer to Italy in the Treaty of Saint-Germain-en-Laye at the end of World War I. Together with the Austrian state of Tyrol, it is part of the Euroregion Tyrol-South Tyrol-Trentino.

In English language, the region is known as Trentino-South Tyrol or by its Italian name Trentino-Alto Adige.

History 

The Romans conquered the region in 15 BC. After the end of the Western Roman Empire, it was divided between the invading Germanic tribes in the Lombard Duchy of Tridentum (today's Trentino), the Alamannic Vinschgau, and the Bavarians (who took the remaining part). After the creation of the Kingdom of Italy under Charlemagne, the Marquisate of Verona included the areas south of Bolzano, while the Duchy of Bavaria received the remaining part.

From the 11th century onwards, part of the region was governed by the prince-bishops of Trent and Brixen, to whom the Holy Roman Emperors had given extensive temporal powers over their bishoprics. Soon, they were overruled by the Counts of Tyrol and Counts of Görz, who also controlled the Puster Valley: in 1363 its last titular, Margarete, Countess of Tyrol ceded the region to the House of Habsburg. The regions north of Salorno were largely Germanized in the early Middle Ages, and important German poets like Arbeo of Freising and Oswald von Wolkenstein were born and lived in the southern part of Tyrol.

The two bishoprics were secularized by the Treaty of Lunéville of 1803 and given to the Habsburgs. Two years later, following the Austrian defeat at Austerlitz, the region was given to Napoleon's ally Bavaria (Treaty of Pressburg, 1805). The new rulers provoked a popular rebellion in 1809, led by Andreas Hofer, a landlord from St. Leonhard in Passeier; this rebellion was crushed the same year. At the resulting Treaty of Paris (28 February 1810), Bavaria ceded the southern part of Tyrol (Trentino and the city of Bolzano) to the Napoleonic Kingdom of Italy. During French control of the region, it was called officially Haut Adige (literally "High Adige", Italian: "Alto Adige"; German: "Hochetsch") in order to avoid any reference to the historical County of Tyrol. After Napoleon's defeat, in 1815, the region returned to Austria.

Under Austrian rule the territory of today's province of South Tyrol was called südliches Tirol or Deutschsüdtirol, but was occasionally also referred to as Mitteltirol, i.e. Middle Tyrol, due to its geographic position, while Südtirol, i.e. South Tyrol, indicated mostly today's province of Trentino. Sometimes Südtirol also indicated the whole of the Trentino-Alto Adige/Südtirol region.

During the First World War, major battles were fought high in the Alps and Dolomites between Austro-Hungarian Kaiserjäger and Italian Alpini, for whom control of the region was a key strategic objective. The collapse of the Austro-Hungarian war effort enabled Italian troops to occupy the region in 1918 and its annexation was confirmed in the post-war treaties, which awarded the region to Italy under the terms of the Treaty of Saint-Germain.

Under the dictatorship of Benito Mussolini, the Fascist dictator of Italy (ruled 1922–1943), the German population was subjected to an increased forced programme of Italianization: all references to old Tyrol were banned and the region was referred to as Venezia Tridentina between 1919 and 1947, in an attempt to justify the Italian claims to the area by historically linking the region to one of the Roman Regions of Italy (Regio X Venetia et Histria). Hitler and Mussolini agreed in 1938 that the German-speaking population would be transferred to German-ruled territory or dispersed around Italy, but the outbreak of the Second World War prevented them from fully carrying out the relocation. Nevertheless, thousands of people were relocated to Nazi Germany and only with great difficulties managed to return to their ancestral land after the end of the war.

In 1943, when the Italian government signed an armistice with the Allies, the region was occupied by Germany, which reorganised it as the Operation Zone of the Alpine Foothills and put it under the administration of Gauleiter Franz Hofer. The region was de facto annexed to the German Reich (with the addition of the province of Belluno) until the end of the war. This status ended along with the Nazi regime and Italian rule was restored in 1945.

Italy and Austria negotiated the Gruber-De Gasperi Agreement in 1946, put into effect in 1947 when the new republican Italian constitution was promulgated, that the region would be granted considerable autonomy. German and Italian were both made official languages, and German-language education was permitted once more. The region was called Trentino-Alto Adige/Tiroler Etschland between 1947 and 1972.

However, the implementation of the agreement was not seen as satisfactory by neither the German-speaking population nor the Austrian government. The issue became the cause of significant friction between the two countries and was taken up by the United Nations in 1960. A fresh round of negotiations took place in 1961 but proved unsuccessful, partly because of popular discontent and a campaign of terrorism and bombings by German-speaking autonomists and separatists led by the South Tyrolean Liberation Committee.

The issue was resolved in 1971, when a new Austro-Italian treaty was signed and ratified. It stipulated that disputes in South Tyrol would be submitted for settlement to the International Court of Justice in The Hague, that the province would receive greater autonomy within Italy, and that Austria would not interfere in South Tyrol's internal affairs. The new agreement proved broadly satisfactory to the parties involved and the separatist tensions soon eased. Matters were helped further by Austria's accession to the European Union in 1995, which has helped to improve cross-border cooperation.

In May 2006, senator-for-life Francesco Cossiga introduced a bill that would allow the region to hold a referendum, in which the local electorate could decide whether to stay within the Italian Republic, become fully independent or return to Austria. All parties, including the separatists, rejected this measure as potentially causing a revival of ethnic tensions.

Geography 

The region is bordered by East and North Tyrol (Austria) to the north-east and north respectively, by Graubünden (Switzerland) to the north-west, and by the Italian regions of Lombardy to the west and Veneto to the south and south-east. It is extremely mountainous, covering a large part of the Dolomites and the southern Alps.

The region is composed of two provinces, Trentino in the south and South Tyrol in the north.

The climate is various through the province, from an alpine climate to subcontinental one, with warm and variable summers and cold and quite snowy winters. The region has always been a favourite destination for tourists, both in winter for skiing in the high mountains and in summer to visit the wide valleys and many lakes (the largest being Lake Garda).

The lowest pass across the Alps, the Brenner Pass, is located at the far north of the region on the border with Austria.

Politics 

The region is divided into two autonomous provinces: Trentino (Autonomous Province of Trento) and South Tyrol (Autonomous Province of Bolzano). The Italian Republic recognised a certain degree of autonomy for the region and its two constituent provinces, which was the result of the Gruber–De Gasperi Agreement of 1946, as well as of the special status of autonomy approved by constitutional law in 1948. This statute gave the region the right to initiate its own laws on a wide range of subjects and to carry out respective administrative functions.

In 1972, the introduction of the second Statute of Autonomy, which was in the centre of the discussions between the Italian and Austrian governments, meant the transfer of the main competencies from the region to the two provinces. The autonomy recognized by the special statute covers the political, legislative, administrative, and fiscal institutions. The second statute turned the region de facto into a loose commonwealth with devolved powers to the two autonomous provinces, with very limited legislative or executive competencies left.

The capital city is Trento, although the two provincial capitals alternate biennially (the other being Bolzano) as the site of the regional assembly.

Administration

Economy 

The region's fertile valleys produce wine, fruit, dairy products, and timber, while its industries include paper, chemical and metal production. The region is a major exporter of hydroelectric power. The most important features of the region's economic structure are the strength of tourism and the special system of co-operation between agriculture and industry. In the last decade, tourism became a very important component of the province's economy. The region, which is a staging-post between the countries of northern Europe and central and southern Italy, has found its true vocation in this leading branch of the services sector with all its spin-offs. The region has a higher concentration of hotels than any other region (6,178 establishments in 2001 with 236,864 hotel beds). The total accommodation capacity of the region counts for 651,426 beds available in hotels and other establishments.

Demographics 

The region has a population of about 1,072,276 people (541,098 in Trentino and 531,178 in South Tyrol). The population density in the region is low compared to Italy as a whole. , the Italian national institute of statistics ISTAT estimated that 90,321 foreigners lived in the region altogether, equal to 8.55% of the total regional population.

Languages 

The main language groups are Italian and German, with small minorities speaking Ladin, Lombard, Mòcheno and Cimbrian. The latter two of which are varieties of the Upper German Bavarian dialect.

In Trentino the majority language is Italian, although there are Cimbrian minorities in the municipality of Luserna and four Mòcheno municipalities in the Mòcheni Valley. There are also Ladin-speaking minorities living in the Fassa Valley and in Non Valley (3.5% of the population). While in Fassa Valley Ladin already enjoys official status, in Non Valley it still does not, despite there being more Ladin speakers in the latter than in the former. Sole Valley also historically belongs to the Ladin area.

In South Tyrol the majority language is German (62% of the population), although in the capital city Bolzano 73% of the population speaks Italian as its maternal language due to internal immigration from other regions of Italy. Italian speakers are also a significant component in other major urban centres of the province, such as in Merano (49% Italian as the mother language) and Brixen (26% mother language). More than 90% of the 120,000 Italian speakers live in Bozen/Bolzano, Merano, Leifers and Brixen, and the greater part of the rest in the small towns south of the capital just north of the border with Trentino or scattered about in very small numbers throughout the rest of the province. The Italian language is a majority in 5 of 116 municipalities. Italian is the first language of 26% of the population (down from 35% in 1960) of the population of 453,000 recorded in the 2011 census, not counting the 51,000 who listed Language as 'Other' who are immigrants. Ladin is the additional official language in some municipalities and a majority in 8. According to the census of 2001, 103 out of 116 communes have a majority of German native speakers, eight of Ladin speakers and five of Italian. Today both German and Italian have the status of co-official languages in South Tyrol.

Heraldry 
The coat of arms quarters the arms of Trentino (black eagle) and the arms of South Tyrol (red eagle).

See also 
Tyrol
Trentino
South Tyrol
Districts of Trentino-Alto Adige/Südtirol

References

External links 

Official site of Trentino-Alto Adige/Südtirol 

 
Autonomous regions of Italy
German diaspora in Italy
German-speaking countries and territories